Numa Ayrinhac (5 September 1881 – 23 March 1951) was a French-Argentine artist. He was born in Espalion (France) in 1881 of Joseph Sixte Ayrinhac and Marie Eulalie Durand, and moved with his parents aged five to the new settlement of Pigüé, Saavedra, Argentina. He is famous for painting portraits of Eva and Juan Domingo Perón.

He died in Buenos Aires on March 23, 1951.

External links
 Biographical sketch (French General Consulate, Argentina)

1881 births
1951 deaths
People from Aveyron
Occitan people
French emigrants to Argentina
People from Buenos Aires Province
Naturalized citizens of Argentina
Argentine portrait painters
20th-century Argentine painters
Argentine male painters
20th-century Argentine male artists